St. Johann am Walde, also Sankt Johann am Walde is a municipality in the district of Braunau am Inn in the Austrian state of Upper Austria.

Geography
Sankt Johann lies in the Innviertel. About 65 percent of the municipality is forest and 32 percent farmland.

References

Cities and towns in Braunau am Inn District